This is a list of space probes that have left Earth orbit (or were launched with that intention but failed), organized by their planned destination.  It includes planetary probes, solar probes, and probes to asteroids and comets, but excludes lunar missions, which are listed separately at List of lunar probes and List of Apollo missions. Flybys (such as gravity assists) that were incidental to the main purpose of the mission are also included. Flybys of Earth are listed separately at List of Earth flybys. Confirmed future probes are included, but missions that are still at the concept stage, or which never progressed beyond the concept stage, are not.

Key
Colour key:

 † means "tentatively identified", as classified by NASA. These are Cold War-era Soviet missions, mostly failures, about which few or no details have been officially released. The information given may be speculative.
 Date is the date of:
 closest encounter (flybys)
 impact (impactors)
 orbital insertion to end of mission, whether planned or premature (orbiters)
 landing to end of mission, whether planned or premature (landers)
 launch (missions that never got underway due to failure at or soon after launch)
 In cases which do not fit any of the above, the event to which the date refers is stated. Note that as a result of this scheme missions are not always listed in order of launch.

 Some of the terms used under Type:
 Flyby: The probe flies by an astronomical body, but does not orbit it
 Orbiter: Part of a probe that orbits an astronomical body
 Lander: Part of a probe that descend to the surface of an astronomical body
 Rover: Part of a probe that acts as a vehicle to move on the solid-surface of an astronomical body
 Penetrator: Part of a probe that impacts an astronomical body
 Atmospheric probe or weather balloon: Part of a probe that descend through or floats in the atmosphere of an astronomical body
 Sample return: Parts of the probe return to Earth with physical samples

 Under Status, in the case of flybys (such as gravity assists) that are incidental to the main mission, "success" indicates the successful completion of the flyby, not necessarily that of the main mission.

Solar probes 

While the Sun is not physically explorable with current technology, the following solar observation probes have been designed and launched to operate in heliocentric orbit or at one of the Earth–Sun Lagrangian points – additional solar observatories were placed in Earth orbit and are not included in this list:

1960–1969

1974–1997

2000–present

Proposed

Mercury probes

Venus probes 

Early programs encompassing multiple spacecraft include:
 Venera program — USSR Venus orbiter and lander (1961–1984)
 Pioneer Venus project — US Venus orbiter and entry probes (1978)
 Vega program — USSR mission to Venus and Comet Halley (1984)

1961–1969

1970–1978

1982–1999

2006–present

Proposed

Earth flybys
See List of Earth flybys

In addition, several planetary probes have sent back observations of the Earth-Moon system shortly after launch, most notably Mariner 10, Pioneers 10 and 11 and both Voyager probes (Voyager 1 and Voyager 2).

Lunar probes 
See List of lunar probes

Mars probes 

Major early programs encompassing multiple probes include:
 Zond program — failed USSR flyby probe
 Mars probe program — USSR orbiters and landers
 Viking program — two NASA orbiters and landers (1974)
 Phobos program — failed USSR orbiters and Phobos landers

1960–1969

1971–1976

1988–1999

2001–2009

2011–2018

2020–Present

Proposed

Phobos probes

Ceres probes

Asteroid probes

Jupiter probes

Saturn probes

Titan probes

Uranus probes

Neptune probes

Pluto probes

Comet probes

Kuiper Belt probes

Probes leaving the Solar System

Other probes to leave Earth orbit
For completeness, this section lists probes that have left (or will leave) Earth orbit, but are not primarily targeted at any of the above bodies.

Cancelled probes and missions

See also

Lists of spacecraft
List of uncrewed spacecraft by program
Discovery and exploration of the Solar System
Robotic spacecraft
Satellites
Sample return mission
Timeline of Solar System exploration

References

External links
Planetary Society: Cassini's Tour of the Saturn System

Lists of spacecraft

Spaceflight timelines
Lists of space missions
Probes
Lists of Solar System objects